The Stream is a TV and online programme that airs from Monday to Thursday, simultaneously live on Al Jazeera English and on YouTube. It is branded as the space where “Al Jazeera's global audience becomes a global community” and is the only show on the channel that features real-time interaction with its audience.

The show is hosted by Femi Oke, a British-Nigerian journalist who has previously worked for CNN and the BBC.

About the show
The Stream covers international news and culture, and features heavy audience interaction. Viewers may watch live on YouTube, where they can speak directly to a producer in a live chat that runs throughout the show. Presenter Femi Oke brings questions and comments from YouTube into the live show and puts them directly to show guests. The programme also hosts daily live conversations on its Instagram account, often featuring guests who have strong Instagram followings. The audience can also ask questions of those guests. The show has more than 200,000 followers on Twitter, where it solicits opinions on the topics it covers and gathers tweets to feature in the show.

The programme positions itself as a conversational show, not an interview show, and guests are encouraged to talk directly to each other without the host's prompting.

The show's Executive Producer is Barry Malone, a former Reuters correspondent who reported from the Horn and East Africa, and from Tunisia, Libya and Iraq. He is the former Acting Managing Editor of Al Jazeera's English-language website aljazeera.com.

The Stream is particularly popular on the African continent and often trends on Twitter in countries such as Nigeria, Ethiopia and Uganda.

Al Jazeera America version
A separate American version of The Stream was featured on Al Jazeera America. It was produced from Washington D.C. and hosted by Lisa Fletcher and Wajahat Ali. The show was identical in style to its Al Jazeera English counterpart, including being shot from the same studio and set in Washington D.C.

It ceased production in 2016 ahead of the closure of Al Jazeera America in April of the same year.

Awards
In 2017, The Stream won a silver medal for best Online News Program at the New York Festivals Best Television and Film Awards.

In 2014, it won a Webby Award for Best Online Film in the News and Politics category for the show 'Meme-ifying Black Interviewees'. The Stream was nominated for two other Webbys the same year.

In 2013, It was awarded the Gracie for Outstanding News Talk Show and secured commendations at the Online Media Awards for Outstanding Digital Team and Best Twitter Feed.

In 2012, The Stream won a Webby Award for People's Choice in news and politics in the online film and video category, a Royal Television Society award for Most Innovative Programme, and was nominated for an Emmy Award for New Approach to News and Documentary Programming.

It has had an Online News Association nomination for “Planned News Events” and a GLAAD nomination for "Outstanding TV Journalism."

References

2010s American television news shows
2011 American television series debuts
2013 American television series debuts
Al Jazeera America original programming
Al Jazeera English original programming
Webby Award winners